Aristide Menezes  (1947 – 7 February 1994) was a political figure in Guinea-Bissau who led the Democratic Front, the first opposition party to be legalized. He died leaving his wife and seven children behind.

Life and career
Menezes helped organize the first public protests after President Joao Bernardo Vieira seized control in 1980 in a coup against the country's first post-independence government, which had ruled since 1975.

He died after a long illness in Lisbon, Portugal.

References

1947 births
1994 deaths
Bissau-Guinean politicians